College Street is a   major street in the central business district of Sydney in New South Wales, Australia. From north to south, it runs from east of Queens Square and St James station to start at the junction of the Prince Albert, St Marys, and Art Gallery roads and runs to Whitlam Square, at Liverpool Street. The street gets its name from a college on the street, St. Mary’s Cathedral College. The street runs beside the eastern border of Hyde Park, and is lined by the Australian Museum, Sydney Grammar School, Cook and Phillip Park Aquatic and Fitness Centre, St Mary's Cathedral, and Australian International College.

An electric tramway formerly ran down College St. It was closed in 1960.

See also

References

 
Streets in Sydney